Maurice Harding (born August 16, 1967), better known by his stage name Mopreme Shakur, originally known as Wycked, is an American rapper. He was a member of the hip-hop group Thug Life and is the stepbrother of rapper Tupac Shakur. He was also a member of the Outlawz (under the name Komani), but later dropped out because of a financial disagreement with Death Row Records.

Career
Mopreme made his recording debut as Mocedes on Tony Toni Toné's 1990 single "Feels Good". He appeared with his stepbrother Tupac on "Papa'z Song", a single from the 1993 album Strictly 4 My N.I.G.G.A.Z., credited as 'Wycked'.

Mopreme and Tupac formed the group Thug Life in 1993, with Big Syke, Macadoshis, and Rated R. The group released one album, Thug Life: Volume 1 (1994), which went gold. Mopreme wrote many of the songs on this album. He was also an original member of Outlawz, but dropped out of the group.

In 2007, he released a mixtape with Assassin, "Black & Brown Pride". He performed on the soundtrack for the feature film Intoxicating, starring Kirk Harris, John Savage, and Eric Roberts. In 2008,  Mopreme was a consulting producer for an episode about his father on the BET series American Gangster.

Discography

Collaboration albums
 Thug Life: Volume 1 (with Thug Life) (1994)
Chart position: #6 R&B/Hip-Hop, #42 Billboard 200
RIAA certification: Gold

Compilation album
Black & Brown Pride (with Assassin) (2007)

Mixtapes
Thug Life: Demo Tape (with Thug Life) (1994)
Evolution of a Thug Life N.I.G.G.A. Vol. 1.1 (2005)
Evolution of a Thug Life N.I.G.G.A. Vol. 1.2 (2005)

Guest appearances

References

External links
 Official Website
 
 

Outlawz members
African-American male rappers
Living people
Shakur family
1969 births
Gangsta rappers
21st-century American rappers